The Battle of the Pips is the name given to an incident on 27 July 1943, part of the Aleutian campaign of World War II.

Radar contact

The order was given to open fire, and 518  shells were fired from both battleships, but there were no hits.

Radar was still a new and unreliable technology at that time, and weather conditions around the Aleutians were characteristically bad, with the very poor visibility normal for the area. No Japanese surface warships were actually within . Author Brian Garfield surmises, based on analysis by modern Aleutian fishing-boat captains, that the pips were rafts of sooty or short-tailed shearwaters, species of migratory petrel that pass through the Aleutians in July every year.

See also
Fog of war

References
Stern, Robert C. US Battleships in Action Part 1. Vol. 1. Carrollton, Texas: Squadron/Signal Publications, Inc., 1980. 10–11.

1943 in Alaska
Aleutian Islands campaign
American Theater of World War II
Maritime incidents in July 1943